The Nazas shiner (Notropis nazas) is a species of cyprinid fish. It is endemic to Mexico and known from Nazas River at Santiago Papasquiaro in the Durango state, its type locality.

References 

Notropis
Freshwater fish of Mexico
Endemic fish of Mexico
Fish described in 1904